Ang Tanging Ina (lit.: The Sole Mother/The Only Mother) is a Philippine comedy film series starring Ai Ai de las Alas in all title roles.

Films

Ang Tanging Ina (2003)

With three dead husbands and twelve children to take care of, what is the modern day working mother supposed to do? Ina Montecillo (Ai-Ai delas Alas) is completely clueless on how to be an income provider and a homemaker at the same time given her dwindling finances of her household. As she desperately hides from her children her efforts to make all ends meet, her children grow resentful of her as she becomes a part of their own problems, but it seems that her best is never good enough. Funnily yet, Ina rallies her cause with all the courage she can muster- to be the best mother she knows how.

Ang Tanging Ina N'yong Lahat (2008)

With the one, big, happy family that she has, any woman would admire Ina Montecillo (Ai-Ai delas Alas) as the embodiment of a perfect mother. But after more than 30 years of doing everything for her family, she realizes she has not done anything for herself. Ina then embarks on a journey of finding her self-worth that surprisingly lands her as the President of the Philippines!
Ina revolutionizes Philippine politics by running the country not as a serious and an uptight leader but as a hilarious and caring mother. Because of this, she gained the trust and the support of the Filipino people. But just as she starts to become the president that everyone loves, she also changes and becomes the mother that her children hate. In the end, Ina has to make the hardest choice of her life – becoming the mother of the nation or becoming the mother of her own children.

Ang Tanging Ina Mo (Last na 'To!) (2010)

Aside from Ai-Ai delas Alas, Eugene Domingo also returns in the last installment as Rowena. Majority of the characters reprise their roles in the film. Marvin Agustin, Kaye Abad, Nikki Valdez, Marc Acueza return in the last film after being absent in the previous sequel. Among the cast, Heart Evangelista is the only character to not appear in the final sequel due to reasons unknown. Also in this movie, appearances of Ina's husbands played by Tonton Gutierrez as Alfredo, Jestoni Alarcon as Kiko and Dennis Padilla as Eddie with the exception of Edu Manzano as Tony.

Crossover

Enteng ng Ina Mo (2011)

Enteng Kabisote (Vic Sotto) wants to retire as the perennial hero of Engkantasya and have a normal life with his family without the magical elements. Ina Montecillo (Ai-Ai delas Alas) longs to have the right partner to be with her for the rest of her life.

One day, Enteng is placed under a powerful evil spell by Engkantasya's evil fairy Satana to fall in love with another woman. And when he meets Ina, he exerts all the effort Ina to fall for him. Ina, on the other hand, slowly opens her heart for this new opportunity of love.

Enteng then tries his best to be a father to Ina's children even if they are not fully supportive of him. But when their relationship gets serious, Ina discovers the truth – Enteng already has a family.

The movie is a crossover of the two film series, Ang Tanging Ina and Enteng Kabisote.

Title
The title is a spoof on the common Tagalog profanity "putang ina", which roughly translates to "son of a bitch".

Characters

References

External links
 

Philippine films by series
2000s Tagalog-language films
2000s comedy films
Star Cinema films
Philippine comedy films
2000s English-language films